Fragmenta Vindobonensia, also known as the Vienna folios, is the name of two illuminated Glagolitic folios that most likely originate from 11th- or 12th-century Croatia and Dalmatia.
They were discovered and first described by Vatroslav Jagić in 1890 and are kept in the National Library in Vienna. Some research puts their origin in western Croatia.

The folios include text from Genesis 12:17–13:14 and Genesis 15:2–15:12.

External links
Croatian Encyclopedia

References

11th-century illuminated manuscripts
12th-century illuminated manuscripts
Cultural history of Croatia
History of Dalmatia
Croatian glagolithic texts
Book of Genesis